Sælen Church is a parish church of the Church of Norway in Bergen Municipality in Vestland county, Norway. It is located in the Sælen neighborhood in the city of Bergen. It is the church for the Sælen parish which is part of the Bergensdalen prosti (deanery) in the Diocese of Bjørgvin. The brown, brick church was built in a rectangular design in 2001 using plans drawn up by the architectural firm . The church seats about 450 people.

History

The parish of Sælen was established in 1982. A rented temporary church building was used for many years while funds were raised for a new church. There was a limited architectural competition in 1998 that was held to determine who would design a new church for the parish. The church was consecrated on 2 December 2001.

See also
List of churches in Bjørgvin

References

Churches in Bergen
Rectangular churches in Norway
Brick churches in Norway
21st-century Church of Norway church buildings
Churches completed in 2001
2001 establishments in Norway